Pizza Capers is a fast food chain and franchise based in Queensland that sells pizza and Italian cuisine. Pizza Capers has over 110 stores throughout Australia, located in the Australian Capital Territory (ACT), New South Wales, Queensland, Tasmania and Victoria. The company has also expanded internationally into Singapore. The company is owned by parent company Retail Food Group.

See also
 List of pizzerias in Australia
 List of restaurant chains in Australia

References

External links
 

Restaurants established in 1996
Fast-food franchises
Pizzerias in Australia
Australian companies established in 1996
Companies based in Queensland
Pizza chains of Australia